Heather Anne Elyse Lilian Munroe-Blum  (born August 25, 1950) is a Canadian academic and businesswoman. She is the former principal and vice-chancellor of McGill University in Montreal, Quebec. She is also a member of the board of directors of the Royal Bank of Canada, and chairperson of the board of directors of the Canada Pension Plan Investment Board.

Awards and recognition 
She is a member of the Trilateral Commission.

Sources 
Biography from the McGill University Administration and Governance site
Biography from the CPPIB site
Canadian Who's Who 1997 entry
The Globe and Mail
Board of Directors and Committee Memberships of RBC

References 

Canadian university and college vice-presidents
Fellows of the Royal Society of Canada
Academic staff of McGill University
McMaster University alumni
Academic staff of McMaster University
Officers of the Order of Canada
Officers of the National Order of Quebec
Businesspeople from Montreal
Scientists from Montreal
Principals of McGill University
UNC Gillings School of Global Public Health alumni
Academic staff of the University of Toronto
Wilfrid Laurier University alumni
Academic staff of York University
Directors of Royal Bank of Canada
Canadian corporate directors
Canadian women in business
CPP Investment Board directors
Canadian financiers
Canadian university and college chief executives
Women investors
Canadian women scientists
Women heads of universities and colleges
1950 births
Living people